Tineke is a Dutch feminine given name, which may refer to:

Tineke Bartels (born 1951), Dutch equestrienne
Tineke Buchter, better known as Tina Strobos (1920 – 2012), Dutch psychiatrist who rescued Jews during the Holocaust
Tineke Hidding (born 1959), Dutch retired heptathlete
Tineke Huizinga (born 1960), Dutch former politician, Secretary of State, and Minister of Environment and Spatial Planning
Tineke Lagerberg (born 1941), Dutch retired freestyle swimmer
Tineke Strik (born 1961), Dutch politician

Dutch feminine given names
Feminine given names